The Scunthorpe Telegraph is a local paid-for newspaper published and distributed weekly in Scunthorpe, England. It was launched on 8 September 1937. Prior to the Scunthorpe Telegraphs launch, the town was served by the Grimsby Evening Telegraph.

The Scunthorpe Telegraph and Grimsby Evening Telegraph and their associated websites became GSMG (Grimsby Scunthorpe Media Group) in 2007. In 2012, Local World acquired owner Northcliffe Media from Daily Mail and General Trust. The Scunthorpe Telegraphs editor is Jamie Macaskill.

Their reporters include David Elliott, Charlie Wilson, Jamie Waller and Paul Crute. Their photographer is David Haber.

The final edition of the Daily Scunthorpe Telegraph was printed on 12 August 2011, with the paper becoming a weekly from 18 August 2011.

References

External links
Official website
Journalism.co.uk - Scunthorpe Telegraph Staff 'devastated' By Weekly Move

Newspapers established in 1937
Newspapers published in Lincolnshire
Scunthorpe
1937 establishments in England